American Chinese may refer to:

 Chinese American, US citizens/residents of Chinese origin or descent
 American-born Chinese, a subset of the above category
 American Chinese cuisine, Chinese cuisine developed by Chinese immigrants to the US
 Americans in China, especially those who participated in the building of Communism, such as:
 Ma Haide (George Hatem) (1910–1988), formerly George Hatem, a doctor and public health official
 Joan Hinton (a former nuclear physicist) and her husband Erwin Engst, who worked in agriculture near Beijing and made significant contributions to the dairy industry
 Sidney Rittenberg, an interpreter, scholar, and former member of the Chinese Communist Party, who eventually returned to the US
 Sidney Shapiro, translator of the Chinese classic Water Margin
 Persons of mixed "American" (usually meaning White American) and Chinese descent; see:
 Eurasian (mixed ancestry), people of mixed Asian and European ancestry
 Amerasian
 Chinese language and varieties in the United States
 China–United States relations, the relations between China and the US